Croatia participated at the 2018 Summer Youth Olympics in Buenos Aires, Argentina from 6 October to 18 October 2018.

Athletics

Beach handball

Judo

Individual

Team

Rowing

Croatia qualified two boats based on its performance at the 2017 World Junior Rowing Championships.

 Boys' pair – Anton Loncaric, Patrik Loncaric
 Girls' pair – Izabela Krakic, Aria Cvitanovic

Sailing

Croatia qualified one boat based on its performance at the 2018 IKA Twin Tip Racing Youth World Championship. Croatia also qualified one boat based on its performance at the Techno 293+ European Qualifier.

 Boys' IKA Twin Tip Racing - 1 boat
 Girls' Techno 293+ - 1 boat

Shooting

Individual

Team

Swimming

Table tennis

Croatia qualified one table tennis player based on its performance at the Road to Buenos Aires (Asia) series.

 Girls' singles - Andrea Pavlovic

Taekwondo

Weightlifting

References

2018 in Croatian sport
Nations at the 2018 Summer Youth Olympics
Croatia at the Youth Olympics